The seventh season of America's Best Dance Crew, also known as America's Best Dance Crew: Return of the Superstars, premiered on April 11, 2012. Return of the Superstars used the same show format of the previous season, in which the crews performed to the music of one specific artist each week. The season  featured artists including Rihanna, Britney Spears, Madonna, Pitbull, David Guetta, LMFAO, Jennifer Lopez, Drake, Flo Rida, and Katy Perry. In the live finale, which aired on June 13, 2012, Elektrolytes was declared the winner.

Cast
Auditions for the seventh season of America's Best Dance Crew were held in four cities: Chicago, Houston, New York City, and Los Angeles. Similar to the previous season, there was no age restriction. Dance crews who had previously competed on the show were also encouraged to audition again.

The cast consisted of nine new dance crews and one returning crew. The appearance of Fanny Pak, who were originally contestants in the second season of ABDC, marked the first time a crew appeared to compete on the show a second time. Each dance crew's hometown and representative region were displayed on their banner during the course of the competition.

Results

: The bottom crew from the first episode battled the bottom crew from the second episode to determine the first elimination of the season.
: The judges saved both crews from elimination.
Key
 (WINNER) The dance crew won the competition and was crowned "America's Best Dance Crew".
 (RUNNER-UP) The dance crew was the runner-up in the competition.
 (IN) The dance crew was safe from elimination.
 (RISK) The dance crew was at risk for elimination.
 (OUT) The dance crew was eliminated from the competition.

Episodes

Episode 1: Britney Spears Challenge
Original Airdate: April 11, 2012
The season kicked off with the first round of crews dancing to a remix of "I Wanna Go". Then, the crews incorporated Spears' hits into their routines. The judges selected four crews to advance to the next round, while the crew who did not make the cut faced elimination in the following week's episode.

Safe: Fanny Pak, 8 Flavahz, Irratik, Stepboys
Bottom: Mix'd Elements

Episode 2: Flo Rida Challenge
Original Airdate: April 18, 2012
The other five competing crews danced to "Wild Ones" featuring Sia, with Flo Rida performing alongside them. Flo Rida then joined the judges table as a special guest judge. Later, the crews crafted their own routines inspired by his songs. After the judges decided the four dance crews that were safe, the bottom crew battled Mix'd Elements to a remix of "Turn Around" to determine which one would be the first eliminated.

Safe: Mos Wanted Crew, Collizion Crew, Rated Next Generation, Elektrolytes
Bottom: Funkdation
Eliminated: Mix'd Elements

Episode 3: Madonna Challenge
Original Airdate: April 25, 2012
The nine remaining crews choreographed routines inspired by Madonna's music videos. Each crew had to incorporate their music video's signature dance style into their routine. In this episode, two teams were sent home after a double-elimination.

Safe: Fanny Pak, Elektrolytes, Mos Wanted Crew, 8 Flavahz, Rated Next Generation, Stepboys
Bottom 3: Collizion Crew, Funkdation, Irratik
Eliminated: Funkdation, Irratik

Episode 4: Drake Challenge
Original Airdate: May 2, 2012
The seven remaining crews selected lyrics from their assigned Drake songs and "brought them to life."

Safe: Rated Next Generation, Mos Wanted Crew, 8 Flavahz, Collizion Crew, Elektrolytes
Bottom 2: Fanny Pak, Stepboys
Eliminated: Stepboys

Episode 5: Jennifer Lopez Challenge
Original Airdate: May 9, 2012
The six remaining crews paid tribute to Jennifer Lopez. Her choreographer, Beau "Casper" Smart, worked with the crews during rehearsals. Each crew's challenge was to highlight a defining moment in Lopez's career. Smart also gave them an additional challenge that linked to their initial challenge.

Safe: 8 Flavahz, Mos Wanted Crew, Elektrolytes
Bottom 3: Collizion Crew, Rated Next Generation, Fanny Pak
Eliminated: Collizion Crew

Episode 6: Pitbull Challenge
Original Airdate: May 16, 2012
The five remaining dance crews began the episode with a dance number to "I Like: The Remix" featuring Enrique Iglesias and The WAV.s, alongside Season 6 runner-up ICONic Boyz. Then, each crew was given a country and an international dance style to incorporate into their routines. In a two-way tie, the Bottom 2 crews advanced to the next round, marking the first time the judges saved both bottom crews from elimination.

Safe: Elektrolytes, 8 Flavahz, Mos Wanted Crew
Bottom 2: Fanny Pak, Rated Next Generation
Eliminated: None

Episode 7: Rihanna Challenge
Original Airdate: May 23, 2012
The five remaining crews created dance routines inspired by Rihanna, beginning with a group performance to "We Found Love" featuring Calvin Harris. Unlike last season, where her choreographer distributed the challenges, Rihanna delivered them to the crews herself.

Safe: Rated Next Generation, 8 Flavahz, Mos Wanted Crew
Bottom 2:  Elektrolytes, Fanny Pak
Eliminated: Fanny Pak

Episode 8: LMFAO Challenge
Original Airdate: May 30, 2012
The four remaining crews danced to songs by LMFAO, beginning with a group performance to "Live My Life" by Far East Movement featuring Justin Bieber. Redfoo from LMFAO handed out the dance challenges, and Season 3 champion Quest Crew visited the rehearsal studio to work with the crews.

Safe: Mos Wanted Crew, Elektrolytes
Bottom 2: Rated Next Generation, 8 Flavahz
Eliminated: Rated Next Generation

Episode 9: David Guetta Challenge
Original Airdate: June 6, 2012
The top three crews competed for the two spots in the championship round to the music of David Guetta. Unlike the format from previous episodes, the crews performed first before the voting results were revealed. Guetta gave each crew the same song mix and challenges to incorporate into their routines. Then, they did a group number to "Titanium" featuring Sia.

Safe: 8 Flavahz
Bottom 2: Elektrolytes, Mos Wanted Crew

After the Bottom 2 was announced, the two crews had to dance battle to determine which one would advance to the finale.

Eliminated: Mos Wanted Crew

Episode 10: Katy Perry Superstar Finale
Original Airdate: June 13, 2012
The final two crews danced to music from the concert film, Katy Perry: Part of Me, after meeting the pop starlet. Then, the winner was crowned. The show also featured performances by past ABDC champions.

Winner: Elektrolytes
Runner-up: 8 Flavahz

References

External links
 

2012 American television seasons
America's Best Dance Crew